Four Gotes is a hamlet in the civil parish of Tydd St Giles in Cambridgeshire, England. The population is included in the civil parish of Leverington.

References

Hamlets in Cambridgeshire
Fenland District